Lady Anne Stanley may refer to:
Anne Stanley, Countess of Castlehaven (1580 – 1647), daughter and heir of Ferdinando Stanley, 5th Earl of Derby
Anne Stanley, Countess of Ancram (c. 1600 – 1656/1657), daughter of William Stanley, 6th Earl of Derby
Anne Stanley, Countess of Derby from Mary Hungerford

See also
 Anne Stanley (politician), Australian politician